Ace Brigode's band varied in number and players. His band included Abe Lincoln, Al Delaney, Al Tresize, Billy Hayes, Bob Tinsley, Bud Lincoln, C. Sexton, Cliff Gamet, Dick Ulm, Dillon Ober, Don Juille, Eddie Allen, Frank Skinner, Fred Brohez, Gene Fogarthy, Happy Masefield, Ignaz Berber, Jeremy Freshour, John Poston, Lucien Criner, Mark Fisher, Max Pitt, Nick Cortez, Penn Fay, Teddy King, Ray Welch, and others. On some labels the recordings are attributed to other names such as Corona Dance Orchestra and Denza Dance Band.

Ace Brigode & His Ten Virginians

1923
November 26 (Okeh)
 You, Darling, You
 Oklahoma Indian Jazz
 Dreams Daddy
 More

Ace Brigode & His Fourteen Virginians

1924
c. March 18 (Okeh)
 Colorado-Waltz
 Monavanna

April 4 (Okeh)
 Never Again
 Don't Mind the Rain

c. June 30 (Okeh)
 Don't Take Your Troubles to Bed
 Only You!

c. August 13 (Okeh)
 Dreary Weather
 Follow the Swallow

c. October 13 (Okeh)
 Bye Bye, Baby
 A Sun-Kist Cottage (in California)

1925
January 13 (Columbia)
 Alabamy Bound
 A Sun-Kist Cottage (in California)

January 23 (Edison)
 Ever-Lovin' Bee
 In the Shade of a Sheltering Tree

February 20 (Edison)
 Tokio Blues
 I'll See You in My Dreams

March 10 (Columbia)
 What a Smile Can Do
 When I Think of You

March 25 (Edison)
 Fooling
 When I Think of You

c. April 24 (Cameo)
 My Sugar
 Wondering

April 30 (Columbia)
 Sleeping Beauty's Wedding
 Yes, Sir! That's My Baby v.2

June 2 (Columbia)
 Wait'll It's Moonlight
 Make Those Naughty Eyes Behave

July 15 (Columbia)
 Alone at Last
 I'm Tired of Everything But You

c. September 1 (Cameo)
 Close Your Eyes
 Tweedle-Dee, Tweedle-Doo (You'll Love Me, I'll Love You)

October 6 (Columbia)
 Normandy
 Why Aren't Yez Eatin' More Oranges?

Ace Brigode and his Orchestra

1940
January 23 (Vocalion)
 Charley, My Boy
 Why Should I Cry Over You?
 I'm Givin' You Warning
 You Know You Belong to Somebody Else (So Why Don't You Leave Me Alone?)

References

Discographies of American artists
Jazz discographies